is a Japanese former football player who last played for Kamatamare Sanuki.

Career
Ichimura retired at the end of the 2019 season.

Club statistics
Updated to 23 February 2020.

References

External links

1984 births
Living people
Association football people from Hokkaido
People from Eniwa, Hokkaido
Japanese footballers
J2 League players
J3 League players
Japan Football League players
Hokkaido Consadole Sapporo players
Roasso Kumamoto players
Yokohama FC players
Kamatamare Sanuki players
Association football defenders